Weiland may refer to:

Weiland (album), 2002 album by the German band Empyrium

People
Bob Weiland (1905–1988), American baseball player 
Cooney Weiland  (1904–1985), Canadian ice hockey forward and coach
Dennis Weiland (born 1974), German footballer
Douglas Weiland  (born 1954), British composer
Ed Weiland  (1914–1971), American baseball pitcher
Julius Johann Weiland  (ca. 1605 – 1663), German composer
Kerry Weiland  (born 1980), American ice hockey defenceman
Kurt Weiland, Austrian Scientologist
Kyle Weiland (born 1986), American baseball pitcher
Niclas Weiland (born 1972), German footballer
Paul Weiland  (born 1953), English film and television director
Rick Weiland (born 1958), American politician in South Dakota
Ric Weiland  (1953–2006), American computer software pioneer and philanthropist
Scott Weiland (1967–2015), American musician, lyricist, and vocalist
Thomas Rainer Maria Weiland, German engineer
Weiland (musician) (born 2000), American rapper, singer, songwriter and music producer.

See also
Wayland (disambiguation)
Weyland (disambiguation)
Wieland (disambiguation)
Wyland (disambiguation)